Abdi Ahmed Hussein is a Somali politician. From January 2014 to January 2015, he served as the Minister of Agriculture of Somalia, having been appointed to the position by Prime Minister Abdiweli Sheikh Ahmed. He was succeeded at the office by Ali Hassan Osman.

References

Living people
Government ministers of Somalia
Year of birth missing (living people)
Place of birth missing (living people)